Stewart Moskowitz (July 6, 1941 – May 23, 2017) was an American artist, illustrator, and children's book author. His paintings in the style of pop art gained popularity through the 1970s and early 1980s in America through the sale of posters and prints.

Early career 
Mozkowitz’s first success in mass produced prints was "American Rabbit". Later successes included "Penguins...the Corporation", "The White Brothers", "Chocolate Mousse", "Patchwork Cow", and "Chicken Soup". His characters and artistic style became especially popular in Japan in the early 1980s. Moskowitz published several children's books of his own in 1982. By 1986, several of the characters in Moskowitz's paintings were used in the movie The Adventures of the American Rabbit. His work remained strongly popular in Japan. His art formed the basis of logo and commercial illustration for several Japanese companies (among them AT&T Japan, Fuji, Mitsubishi, Panasonic), children's books, and animated movies in that country.

A Moskowitz painting of the planet Earth as a fish was used the logo for Fuji TV's Naruhodo! The World during its broadcast run. Parasa & Dinky Dinos became a Japanese franchise including a coloring cartridge for the Konami Picno; at least one animated short; and Parasa (a yellow parasaurolophus) was instated as the mascot of newly renamed Sakura Bank in 1992, appearing on bank cards, pass books, and other materials.

Moskowitz registered several dozen paintings under United States' copyright in the late 20th and early 21st centuries.

Death 
By mid-May, 2017, Moskowitz had been diagnosed with terminal cancer and was in hospice care. A YouCaring (now part of GoFundMe) fundraiser raised over $10,000 to bring his family together, given his condition. Moskowitz's death came shortly after, on May 23, 2017.

Artistic works

Paintings (1970s) 

 American Rabbit
 Peeky-Turcock
 The White Brothers
 Penguins...the Corporation
 Loose Appaloosas
 Star Rabbit
 Patchwork Cow
 Giant Pig/Pig With House

Bibliography

As author

As illustrator

References 

1941 births
2017 deaths
American cartoonists
American children's writers
Writers from California
Pratt Institute alumni